Sammy Thurman Brackenbury (born December 11, 1933), is a ProRodeo Hall of Fame barrel racer.

Life
Sammy Thurman Brackenbury was born Sammy Lenore on a ranch on the Big Sandy Wash near Wikieup, Arizona. The family moved around when she was a child. Her father, Sam Fancher, was a rodeo competitor in many events.

 She learned from her father how to ride horses, rope calves, and many other rodeo events. She even chased mustangs in the deserts. Once, at the Rodeo Cowboys Association (RCA) Santa Maria Rodeo, when Brackenberry was registered to compete at barrel racing and her father was registered to compete in team roping, his partner did not show up.  Fancher got permission from the RCA for his daughter to rope instead. Fancher was anxious but Brackenberry handled it like it expert. Brackenberry also roped at California Rodeo Salinas, placed second, and was one of the first women there too.

Career
She competed in professional rodeo in many events, but her main event was barrel racing. She also used her rodeo skills in the film business, for example, by falling off horses for a movie stunt.

In addition to being a hall of fame barrel racer, she is also an American World Barrel Racing Champion. She qualified for 11 National Finals Rodeos (NFR). In December 1965, she won the world barrel racing championship at the NFR in Oklahoma City, Oklahoma.

Summary
Brackenbury has five go-round wins from 1960 through 1968. She placed in twelve consecutive go-rounds (six per year) in her first two NFRs in Scottsdale and Santa Maria in 1960 and 1961. In 1960, she tied for the NFR Average championship in the Girl's Rodeo Association (GRA) with another world champion, Jane Mayo. The next year, 1964, she became the reserve NFR Average champ and the Reserve World Champion, with a career best of $7,042 season earnings. She finished inside the top five of the GRA World Standings five times. The climax of her career was winning the World Barrel Racing Championship in 1965.

Honors
 2012 Rodeo Hall of Fame in the National Cowboy & Western Heritage Museum
 2013 WPRA California Circuit True Grit award
 2018 WPRA California Pioneer Cowgirl award
 2019 ProRodeo Hall of Fame

References

Bibliography

External links 
 Women's Professional Rodeo Association
 Professional Rodeo Cowboys Association
 National Finals Rodeo

1933 births
Living people
Roping (rodeo)
American barrel racers
American female equestrians
21st-century American women